Name resolution can refer to any process that further identifies an object or entity from an associated, not-necessarily-unique alphanumeric name:
 In computer systems, it refers to the retrieval of the underlying numeric values corresponding to computer hostnames, account user names, group names, and other named entities;
 In programming languages, it refers to the resolution of the tokens within program expressions to the intended program components
 In semantics and text extraction, it refers to the determination of the specific person, actor, or object a particular use of a name refers to.